Michael Hobelsberger (25 September 1935 – 11 November 2004) was a German ice hockey player. He competed in the men's tournaments at the 1960 Winter Olympics and the 1964 Winter Olympics.

References

1935 births
2004 deaths
Olympic ice hockey players of Germany
Olympic ice hockey players of the United Team of Germany
Ice hockey players at the 1960 Winter Olympics
Ice hockey players at the 1964 Winter Olympics
Sportspeople from Garmisch-Partenkirchen